This is a list of maladaptive schemas, often called early maladaptive schemas, in schema therapy, a theory and method of psychotherapy. An early maladaptive schema is a pervasive self-defeating or dysfunctional theme or pattern of memories, emotions, and physical sensations, developed during childhood or adolescence and elaborated throughout one's lifetime, that often has the form of a belief about the self or the world.

Disconnection and rejection
 Abandonment/instability
 The belief system involving the sense that significant others will not be able to continue providing support, connection, strength, or protection because they are unstable, unpredictable, unreliable; because they will eventually die; or because they found someone better.

 Mistrust/abuse
 The belief system involving the sense that others will intentionally hurt, abuse, humiliate, cheat, lie, manipulate, take advantage, or neglect.

 Emotional deprivation
 The belief that one's standard for emotional support will not be met by others.

 Defectiveness/shame
 The belief that one is defective, bad, unwanted, inferior, or unworthy. This includes the fear of insecurities being exposed to significant others, accompanied by hypersensitivity to criticism, rejection, and blame.

 Social Isolation/alienation
 The belief that one is isolated from other people; the feeling of not being a part of any groups.

Impaired autonomy and performance
 Dependence/incompetence
 The belief that one cannot handle daily responsibilities without the help of others.

 Vulnerability to harm or illness
 The belief system involving the exaggeration of fear that catastrophe will strike at any time; the catastrophes may be medical, emotional, or external.

 Enmeshment/underdeveloped self
 The belief system that one must please others at the expense of self or social development.

 Failure
 The belief that one will fail in everything.

Impaired limits
 Entitlement/grandiosity
 The belief that one is superior to others, which allows one to have special rights and privileges.

 Insufficient self-control/self-discipline
 The conflict between life goals and low self control, perhaps seeking comfort instead of trying to perform daily responsibilities.

Other-directedness
 Subjugation
 The belief that one should surrender control to others, suppressing desires in order to avoid anger, retaliation, or abandonment.

 Self-sacrifice
 The belief system involving excessive selflessness, focused on meeting the needs of others at the expense of one's own desire.

 Approval-seeking/recognition-seeking
 The desire to gain approval, recognition, or attention from other people at the expense of developing a secure and true sense of self.

Overvigilance and inhibition
 Negativity/pessimism
 The belief system involving the overemphasis on the negative aspects of life including pain, death, loss, disappointment, conflict, guilt, resentment, unsolved problems, potential mistakes, betrayal, or things that could go wrong; neglecting positive aspects of life.

 Overcontrol/emotional inhibition
 The belief system involving the inhibition of actions, feelings, or communications to avoid negative consequences.

 Unrelenting standards/hypercriticalness
 The belief that one must strive to meet very high personal standards, usually to avoid criticism, leading to hypercriticalness toward self and/or others.

 Punitiveness
 The belief that people should face consequences for their mistakes.

See also

References

Cognitive therapy